The Steelers franchise has a rich history of producing well-known sportscasters over the years: the most famous of whom was Myron Cope, who served as a Steelers radio color commentator for 35 seasons (1970-2004).

Additionally, several former players for the Pittsburgh Steelers picked up the broadcast microphone:
Lynn Swann (wide receiver, 1974-1982) - starting in 1978 was a sideline reporter for ABC Sports. Over the 2005 and 2006 NFL seasons, he had taken a leave of absence to unsuccessfully pursue the governor's office of Pennsylvania. Swann has also had several Hollywood roles, making cameos in 1998's The Waterboy, 1993's The Program and 1991's The Last Boy Scout. His TV cameos include Saturday Night Live and The Drew Carey Show.
Merril Hoge (running back, 1987-1993) - has hosted sports shows on ESPN and ESPN2 since 1996 most notably NFL Matchup, Football Friday and NFL 2Night/ NFLLive.  He has also had hosting duties on ABC/ESPN's Great Outdoor Games. He also served as an analyst for the Steelers radio network alongside Bill Hillgrove and the late Myron Cope.
Mark Malone (quarterback, 1980-1987) - began his career as a sports reporter for Pittsburgh's WPXI-TV from 1991–1994, from 1994 to 2004 he hosted nationally-televised sports shows for ESPN, including NFL 2Night, NFL Matchup and the X-Games. From 2004-2008 he was director of sports broadcasting at CBS2 Chicago. Now Hosts his own program weeknights from 7 PM - 10 PM on NBC Sports Radio.
Jerome Bettis (running back, 1998-2011) - formerly an analyst for NBC Sunday Night Football's Football Night in America pregame with Bob Costas 2006–2009, also is host of the Pittsburgh broadcast The Jerome Bettis Show 1998–2007 on KDKA-TV and 2007-Present  on WPXI-TV.
Hines Ward (wide receiver, 1996-2005) - former analyst for NBC Sunday Night Football's Football Night in America.  Pregame/halftime analyst for Notre Dame Football on NBC (2013–2015), Now is a Sports Analyst for CNN since 2016 and hosts The Hines Ward Show 2013–Present on WPXI-TV.  
Bill Cowher (head coach, 1992-2006) - co-host of CBS Sports NFL Today on CBS as a studio analyst, joining Dan Marino, Shannon Sharpe, and Boomer Esiason. Cowher had a cameo in 1998's The Waterboy, and in 2007 Cowher appeared in the ABC reality television series Fast Cars and Superstars: The Gillette Young Guns Celebrity Race, featuring a dozen celebrities in a stock car racing competition. Cowher matched up against Gabrielle Reece and William Shatner.  Cowher has also made a cameo in The Dark Knight Rises with several other Steelers players, as the coach of the Gotham Rogues.
Terry Bradshaw (quarterback, 1970-1983) - started as a guest commentator for CBS NFL playoff broadcasts from 1980–1982, after retirement he joined Verne Lundquist at CBS full-time as a game analyst on what became one of the top rated sports broadcasts. In 1990, he went from the broadcast booth to the pregame studio shows anchoring the NFL Today pregame shows on CBS and later on Fox NFL Sunday. In recent years he has started to host regular features in addition to the show, "Ten yards with TB" and the "Terry Awards". In addition to broadcasting Bradshaw has had appearances in several major motion pictures (most notably Smokey and the Bandit II, Black Sunday, and Failure to Launch) as well as spokesman for Radio Shack and SaniKing among others in commercials. He also has made many guest appearances on sitcoms from Married... with Children to Evening Shade.
Kordell Stewart (quarterback 1998-2003) - currently an ESPN analyst for all NFL shows and an Analyst for TuneIn's NFL Coverage. 
Tunch Ilkin (offensive tackle, 1980–1992) - former Steelers radio color commentator; Pittsburgh CW Network In the Locker Room Host 2006–2021.
Craig Wolfley (offensive lineman, 1980-1989) - current Steelers radio sideline reporter; Pittsburgh CW Network In the Locker Room Host 2006–Present.
Rod Woodson (defensive back, 1987–1996), (1997 with 49ers), (1998-2001 with Ravens), and (2002-2003 with Raiders) - current analyst for NFL Network 2003–Present.
Jack Ham (linebacker, 1971–1982) - did color commentary for the Steelers on KDKA-TV during the NFL Preseason into the early 2000s before leaving and being replaced by former teammate Edmund Nelson. Ham also co-hosted some pregame and postgame shows on the station, but was replaced by Nelson in those roles as well. Since 2000, Ham has been the color analyst on the Penn State football radio network.
Edmund Nelson (defensive lineman, 1982-1988) - served as the color analyst for Pittsburgh Steelers pre-season games and participated as a co-host to Bob Pompeani in KDKA-TV's regular season pregame program Steelers Kickoff until retiring in 2015.
Charlie Batch (quarterback, 2002-2012) - took a Steelers pregame studio analyst job with KDKA-TV for the 2013 season alongside KDKA-TV sports anchor Bob Pompeani and ex-Steeler defensive lineman Edmund Nelson, effectively ending his NFL career. He continued in this role for the 2014 season. In 2015, Batch replaced the retiring Nelson as KDKA-TV's color commentator for preseason games, while becoming the main studio analyst for the Steelers pregame coverage prior to the national airing of The NFL Today. Former teammate Chris Hoke replaced Nelson for the post-game show.
Tony Dungy (defensive back, 1977-1979) - as an analyst on NBC's Football Night in America.

See also
List of Pittsburgh Steelers broadcasters

References

broadcasting